Frederick Huth, formerly known as Johann Friedrich Andreas Huth (1777–1864), was a German-born British merchant banker, who established the London merchant bank Frederick Huth & Co in 1809.

Professional career 
Frederick Huth was born on the 29 October 1777 in the German town of Stade, then part of the Electorate of Hanover (Lower Saxony, Germany). He was the second son of Johann Friedrich Huth (d. 1801), a soldier of the Scharnhorst regiment, and his wife, Marie Amelia (d. 1812), daughter of Johann Thee, farmer. The family settled in 1781 at nearby Harsefeld, where Johann Huth worked as a tailor and where Friedrich attended local schools. In 1791 Huth was apprenticed to Brentano Urbieta & Co., a Spanish merchant house at Hamburg. In 1797 he moved to Spain, and he also lived in South America before settling in London and establishing Frederick Huth & Co., which became one of London's leading banking houses.  In 1829 Huth was appointed as London financial advisor and banker to the Spanish queen and financial agent for the Spanish government. He retired from Frederick Huth & Co. in the 1850s.

Personal life
Huth was a Lutheran.

In 1806, Huth married Manuela Felipa Lorenza Mayfren at Corunna, Spain. Their children were:

Charles Frederick Huth (1806–1895) was a merchant banker, and art collector
Fernando Huth (1808–1826)
Amelia Huth (1810–1887), married Daniel Meinertzhagen
Johanna Huth (1810–1896)
Louisa Francesca Huth (1812–1849)
Manuella Huth (1814–1887)
Henry Huth (1815–1878), was a noted bibliophile
Ann Huth (1817–1879)
Maria Huth (1817–1868)
Edward Huth (1819, d. 26 Apr 1844)
Louis Huth (1821–1905), was a merchant banker, art collector, art dealer and patron of Aesthetic movement artists

References

1777 births
1864 deaths
British bankers
German emigrants to England
Frederick
People from Stade (district)